Battle of Korsuń, (May 26, 1648) was the second significant battle of the Khmelnytsky Uprising. Near the site of the present-day city of Korsun-Shevchenkivskyi in central Ukraine, a numerically superior force of Cossacks and Crimean Tatars under the command of Hetman Bohdan Khmelnytsky and Tugay Bey attacked and defeated Polish–Lithuanian Commonwealth forces under the command of Hetmans Mikołaj Potocki and Marcin Kalinowski. As in the previous battle at Zhovti Vody, the outmanned Commonwealth forces took a defensive position, retreated, and were thoroughly routed by the opposing force.

Before the battle
On May 16, 1648, Bohdan Khmelnytsky's forces overwhelmed and defeated Commonwealth forces under the command of Stefan Potocki at the Battle of Zhovti Vody. Stefan's father, Grand Crown Hetman Mikołaj Potocki, was unable to send reinforcements in time to relieve him; however, with the number of defections from the force that was sent to fight Khmelnytsky (over 5,000 registered Cossacks switched their allegiance), it is doubtful that the reinforcements could have helped defeat the combined Cossack and Tatar army of 15,000. From his fortified position beyond Chyhyryn, fifteen miles from Zhovti Vody, Mikołaj Potocki signaled a retreat on 13 May to the north. Near Cherkasy, the lone survivor from the battle at Zhovti Vody reached Potocki on 19 May with news of the disastrous defeat.  Two days later, Potocki had only made it as far as the present-day city of Korsun-Shevchenkivskyi when he decided to wait for Jeremi Wisniowiecki's army of six thousand.

With combined forces of about 5,000 men, Field Crown Hetman Marcin Kalinowski and Great Crown Hetman Mikołaj Potocki awaited Khmelnytsky's advance parties who were soon seen crossing the Tiasmyn River.  Soon they were crossing the Ros River into Korsun, so Potocki ordered Korsun burned and placed his army in front of his camp where he skirmished with the Tatars.  Then the Cossacks started to dam the river at Stebliv.  During a council of war, given the superior forces of the enemy, Potocki decided to retreat along the road to Bohuslav in corral formation the next day.

The battle
The retreat started at dawn, during which the Cossack and Tatar armies allowed Potocki's forces to pass until they reached Horokhova Dibrova, about a mile and a half from Korsun, at noon. This proved to be disastrous, as Khmelnytsky had ordered his First Polkovnyk (colonel) Maxym Kryvonis (aka "Crooked-nose" or Perebyinis) to prepare a trap in this "swampy valley between two precipices", including trenches and a barricaded road.  The resulting chaos as the Commonwealth's forces entered an impenetrable valley allowed Khmelnytsky's Cossack forces to flank them from both sides, quickly slaughtering whole divisions. Only about 1,000-1,500 of the Commonwealth forces (under a Colonel Korycki) managed to escape. Both Hetmans were taken prisoner, and the rest of the army was either captured or killed.

Aftermath
The Polish–Lithuanian Commonwealth was left without a military commander, and Khmelnytsky continued his uprising, marshaling his forces towards Bila Tserkva.

References

External links
 Military strategy of Bohdan Khmelnytsky

Conflicts in 1648
1648 in Europe
Korsun
History of Cherkasy Oblast
Korsun-Shevchenkivskyi